Shanda M. Yates (born March 29, 1982) is an American politician, representing the 64th district in the Mississippi House of Representatives since 2020.

Early life and education 
Yates was born on March 29, 1982 in Jackson, Mississippi. She graduated from Hinds Community College in 2001 with an associate's degree and then enrolled at the University of Southern Mississippi, graduating with honors and a bachelor's degree in English. She received her Juris Doctor from the Mississippi College School of Law in 2007, where she also served as an editor for the Mississippi College Law Review. She was admitted to the Mississippi Bar in 2007.

Career 
Yates practices as a partner with her husband as an attorney.

In February 2019, Mississippi Democratic House Minority Leader David Baria asked Yates if she wished to run against Bill Denny in the Mississippi House, a 32-year house incumbent of the 64th district and House Republican Floor Leader. She decided to run after initial reluctance, and over the months that followed, Yates and her campaign knocked on around 10,000 doors. Her campaign received assistance from national organizations like California-based Sister District, an organization that targets GOP-held seats. She proceeded through the Democratic Primary unopposed and, in the general election, won against Denny by 168 votes, a 51%–49% margin. She assumed office on January 7, 2020.

As of 2021, she serves on the following committees: Compilation, Revision and Publication; Corrections; Insurance; Judiciary B; Judiciary En Banc; and Transportation. Since 2020, she has served as Deputy Chair for the Mississippi House Democrat caucus leadership.

In January 2022, she left the Democratic Party and became an Independent.

Political positions 
Yate's top priorities when running for election were increasing school funding and addressing infrastructure problems.

In 2020, Yates voted yes on the bill to change the Mississippi State Flag.

Personal life 
Yates is married to Yancy Burns, and they have one child. She and her husband are Methodist.

References 

1982 births
21st-century American politicians
Living people
Members of the Mississippi House of Representatives
Mississippi Democrats
Mississippi Independents
Hinds Community College alumni
University of Southern Mississippi alumni
Mississippi College School of Law alumni
Mississippi lawyers
Women state legislators in Mississippi
Politicians from Jackson, Mississippi
21st-century American women politicians